"I Wonder Why" is a doo-wop song, written by Melvin Anderson with lyrics by Ricardo Weeks. The song was first recorded by Dion and the Belmonts.

Background
It is sung from the point of view of a man telling his girlfriend that he loves her but does not know why.  The song is noted for Carlo Mastrangelo bass part.

Chart performance
"I Wonder Why" was released as Laurie Records' first single, (number 3013), and was the group's first national pop chart hit, in 1958. The song went to number 22 on the Hot 100.

Popular culture
The song was used in the film A Bronx Tale
The song was in the pilot episode of the television series The Sopranos.
John Carpenter's adaptation of Stephen King's Christine.  
A cover was sung by Nicolas Cage in Peggy Sue Got Married. 
The Rock-afire Explosion parodied the song for use in ShowBiz Pizza Place restaurants.

Cover versions
A cover was also sung by Showaddywaddy in 1978, reaching number 2 in the UK Singles Chart.
Australian band Ol' 55 covered the song on their album, Take It Greasy (1976).

References

1958 songs
1958 debut singles
Dion DiMucci songs
Grammy Hall of Fame Award recipients
Doo-wop songs
Laurie Records singles
1978 singles
Showaddywaddy songs